John Felix August Körling (born 17 December 1864, Kristdala — died 8 January 1937, Halmstad) was a Swedish composer, church musician and music teacher. He was the son of August Körling and the father of American photographer Torkel Korling.

Körling wrote operettas (Guldgruvan, Sommarflirt, Rubber, and Jockeyen), stage music, and folk songs. Today he is best known for being a highly regarded composer of children's songs.

References 

1864 births
1937 deaths
Swedish composers
Swedish male composers
Children's songwriters